Kalu Cheema (Urdu: کالوچیمہ) is a small village in Wazirabad Tehsil, Gujranwala District, Punjab, Pakistan. It is located behind Ahmad Nagar Chattha.

Demography 
Kalu Cheema has a population of 2,000.

Education 
In Kalu Cheema, the Government Primary School Kalu Cheema is the only source of education. For higher education, students move to

 Government Boys Higher Secondary School, Ahmad Nagar Chattha
 Youth Group of Schools and Colleges, Ahmad Nagar Chattha

See also 
 Ahmad Nagar Chattha
 Gujranwala

References 

Villages in Gujranwala District